Kyivmiskbud (a portmanteau for Kyiv City Construction) is a major construction holding company of Ukraine and the biggest construction company in Kyiv. It is also considered a community company that subordinates to the city government, which controls 80% of the company's stock. The holding company does not have full ownership of its held companies, many of which also co-owned with the fund union "Ukrayina".

The company's design bureau is owned by the Funding Union "Ukrayina" (51%) and the Grigorishin's Energy Standard Group SA (47%) through its Cyprus off-shore company the Energy Standard Projects Limited.

History
The holding company was created in 1955 as Main Administration of Communal and Civil Engineering of the Kyiv City Executive Committee (today Kyiv City State Administration) based on various cities' house-building associations. It was abbreviated in Russified manner as Glavkievgorstroi. The first project was a panel apartment five story house on bulvar Druzhby Narodiv that was built back in 1958.

The holding company consists of several smaller construction corporations, number of daughter companies (subsidiaries) and several affiliates.

List of subsidiaries

Construction and installation sector
 Kyivmiskbud-3 (Kyiv City Construction) since 1943
 KyivMiskbud-4 
 Kyivmiskbud-6 
 Reinforced concrete production factory "DBK-3" (abbr. House-building Consortium)
 DBK-4
 Taiga
 SBMU (abbr. Specialized construction and installation administration)

Special installation and decoration
 Kyivspetskbud (Kyiv Special Construction)
 Kyivelectromontazh (Kyiv Electric Installation)
 Kyivpidzemdorbud-2 (Kyiv Subterranean Roads Construction)
 Kyivoblytsbud (Kyiv Decorative Construction)
 Promenerhoavtomatyka (Industrial Energy Automation)

Construction equipment and transportation sector
 Special Machine Administration
 Budmekhanizatsia (Construction Equipment)
 Special Machine Administration 2
 Construction Administration 2
 Miskbudtrans (City Construction Transportation)
 ATP-6 (abbr. Autotransport Enterprise)
 Experiment Maintenance Enterprise
 ATP-1
 ATP-2
 ATP-7
 Autobudkompleks-K (Auto Construction Complex)
 ATP-5
 Elite Construction Mechanization

Materials production sector
 Promin (Beam)
 Woodworking Consortium 7
 Woodworking Consortium 3
 Wood chipboards Factory
 Experiment Mechanical Factory
 Factory of reinforced concrete products 1
 Zhulyany
 House-building Consortium "Vidradny" (Pleasing)
 Experiment Mechanical Factory "Metalist" (Metalworker)
 Beton-Kompleks (Concrete Complex)
 Kyivoporyadkomplekt (Kyiv Polishing Set)
 Factory of Finishing Materials

Affiliates
 Construction Company "Ukrenerhobud" (Ukrainian Energy Construction)
 Kyivbuddetalkomplekt (Kyiv Construction Detail Set)
 Budtrans (Construction Transport)
 Polar-Ukrayina
 Novobud (New Construction)
 Pre Tech Ukraine

See also
 Kyivpastrans, another city's company

References

External links
 Official website
 Dyenkov, D. Kyivmiskbud: history of the conquest movement. Ukrayinska Pravda. 2010-08-27
 Company description at the Ukraine Today website
 List of all Kyiv city companies

Construction and civil engineering companies of Ukraine
Companies based in Kyiv
Companies owned by municipalities of Ukraine
Government of Kyiv
Economy of Kyiv
Ukrainian brands
Construction and civil engineering companies established in 1955
1955 establishments in Ukraine